The 1987 Baltimore Orioles season was a season in American baseball. It involved the Orioles finishing 6th in the American League East with a record of 67 wins and 95 losses.

Offseason
 January 30, 1987: Jack O'Connor was signed as a free agent by the Orioles.
 February 12, 1987: Ray Knight was signed as a free agent by the Orioles.
 March 30, 1987: Rich Bordi was released by the Orioles.

Regular season
On April 15, 1987, Juan Nieves threw the first no hitter in Milwaukee Brewers history. The Brewers beat the Baltimore Orioles by a score of 7–0.

Season standings

Record vs. opponents

Notable transactions
 May 22, 1987: John Shelby and Brad Havens were traded by the Orioles to the Los Angeles Dodgers for Tom Niedenfuer.
 June 2, 1987: Jack Voigt was drafted by the Orioles in the 9th round of the 1987 Major League Baseball Draft.
 June 23, 1987: Doug Corbett was signed as a free agent with the Orioles.
 August 21, 1987: Doug Corbett was released by the Orioles.
 August 31, 1987: Mike Flanagan was traded by the Orioles to the Toronto Blue Jays for Oswaldo Peraza and a player to be named later. The Blue Jays completed the deal by sending José Mesa to the Orioles on September 4.

Roster

Player stats

Batting

Starters by position
Note: Pos = Position; G = Games played; AB = At bats; H = Hits; Avg. = Batting average; HR = Home runs; RBI = Runs batted in

Other batters
Note: G = Games played; AB = At bats; H = Hits; Avg. = Batting average; HR = Home runs; RBI = Runs batted in

Pitching

Starting pitchers
Note: G = Games pitched; IP = Innings pitched; W = Wins; L = Losses; ERA = Earned run average; SO = Strikeouts

Other pitchers
Note: G = Games pitched; IP = Innings pitched; W = Wins; L = Losses; ERA = Earned run average; SO = Strikeouts

Relief pitchers
Note: G = Games pitched; W = Wins; L = Losses; SV = Saves; ERA = Earned run average; SO = Strikeouts

Farm system

References

1987 Baltimore Orioles team page at Baseball Reference
1987 Baltimore Orioles season at baseball-almanac.com

Baltimore Orioles seasons
Baltimore Orioles season
Baltimore Orioles